Eric Campbell may refer to:

 Eric Campbell (actor) (1880–1917), Scottish silent film star
 Eric Campbell (baseball) (born 1987), American baseball player
 Eric Campbell (basketball) (born 1977), American basketball player
 Eric Campbell (political activist) (1893–1970), Australian political activist, leader of the New Guard Fascist movement
 Eric Campbell (reporter), Australian foreign correspondent 
 Eric Campbell Geddes (1875–1937), British Conservative politician
 Eric-Campbell, a British car maker between 1919 and 1926

See also
 Erik Campbell (born 1966), American gridiron football coach and former player